Tír na nÓg is the first album by Irish band Tír na nÓg. It was released in May 1971 in the United Kingdom by Chrysalis Records and distributed by Island Records but was not published in the United States because Leo O'Kelly and Sonny Condell refused to record a cover of Bob Dylan's "Maggie's Farm" for the album, a song they regularly played live.German and Spanish presses of the LP have an Island label although the Chrysalis logo also appears on them.

Track listing

LP track listing

Compact Cassette track listing

Personnel
Sonny Condell - vocals, guitar, Moroccan pottery drums, tablas, jews harp
Leo O'Kelly - vocals, guitar, dulcimer, electric bass, tin whistle
Nic Kinsey - engineering
Nick Harrison - arranger
Bill Leader - production

Additional personnel
Barry Dransfield – fiddle on "Tir Na Nog"
Annie Crozier – psaltery on "Time Is Like A Promise"

Release history

References

1971 debut albums
Chrysalis Records albums
Island Records albums
Tír na nÓg (band) albums